Japan  is a 2008 American independent film written and directed by Fabien Pruvot.

Plot
The film follows a contract killer who goes by the code name Japan. He meets a man named Alfred at a hotel, who was recently evicted from his home. The two get along and Japan befriends Alfred. Their friendship leads the film into a twist and turn ending.

Production
The film was shot in Los Angeles, California and Phoenix, Arizona.

External links 
 

American action films
2008 films
2008 action films
2000s English-language films
2000s American films